Shingani's Friday mosque (Jamacaha Shingani in Somali) is said to be one of the oldest mosques in Mogadishu and in Africa. Historically, Jamacaha Shingani is the most important building in the historical quarter of Shingani.

See also 

 Jama'a Xamar Weyne, Xamar Weyne
 Fakr ad-Din Mosque
 Arba'a Rukun Mosque
 Awooto Eeday
'Adayga Mosque
Mohamed Al Tani

References

Mosques in Somalia